Eddie Bass (born 1957) is an American politician. He served as a Democratic member of the Tennessee House of Representatives for the 65th district.

Early life
Eddie Bass was born on November 3, 1957 in Giles County, Tennessee. He graduated from Giles County High School in Pulaski, Tennessee, the Tennessee Law Enforcement Academy and the Tennessee Law Enforcement Training Academy Criminal Investigation School.

Career
Bass served as a sheriff for Giles County.

From 2006 to 2012, Bass served as a state representative for the sixty-fifth district of Tennessee. He was a member of the House Agriculture Committee, the House Judiciary Committee, and the House General Sub-committee of Judiciary. He proposed a bill supported by the National Rifle Association that would have forced businesses to allow employees to store firearms in vehicles parked on company lots. He considered running for reelection as a Republican in 2012, but renounced after he had angered GOP bosses by proposing the gun bill as a Democrat before them.

Personal life
Bass is a member of the Churches of Christ.

References

Living people
1957 births
People from Giles County, Tennessee
Tennessee sheriffs
Democratic Party members of the Tennessee House of Representatives